Eupithecia rhadine is a moth in the family Geometridae. It is found in Taiwan.

The wingspan is about 15 mm. The fore- and hindwings are brownish grey.

References

Moths described in 2007
rhadine
Moths of Taiwan